Disability Rights UK (DR UK) is a UK pan-disability charity which was set up with the aim of representing the needs and expectations of disabled people in the UK. Disability Rights UK was formed as a result of several disability charities merging in 2012.

History
Disability Rights UK was formed through a unification of Disability Alliance, Radar and National Centre for Independent Living on 1 January 2012. RADAR was formed in 1977 as the Royal Association for Disability and Rehabilitation and later renamed to Royal Association for Disability Rights.

About RADAR 
RADAR was an umbrella organisation which sought to work with and for disabled people in the UK. Its aim was to remove structural, economic and attitudinal barriers. It campaigned and produced policy statements and briefings on related issues and provided support services for its member organisations.

Activities

Campaigning
Disability Rights UK campaigns on a number of issues, including independent living, work and education, and against hate crime, bullying and negative attitudes towards disabled people.

Advice and Information
Disability Rights UK offers several advice phonelines: a service for disabled students, a service to report disability discrimination, support with personal budgets, and welfare rights advice for member organisations. As well as this, it publishes factsheets and guides on issues relevant to disabled people, such as working and obtaining social care.

National Key Scheme

The National Key Scheme (formerly known as the RADAR Key Scheme) is a universal key scheme to enable disabled people to access accessible toilets in the UK to prevent misuse and vandalism of these facilities. The scheme is administered by Disability Rights UK. There are at least 9,000 toilets in the UK that can be accessed with the key. The key itself is designed with many featuressuch as its large sizeto enable users with physical impairments to use the key with greater ease. Keys can be obtained from Disability Rights UK, local authorities, and online.

References

External links 
 

Charities based in London
Charities for disabled people based in the United Kingdom
Disability rights organizations
1977 establishments in the United Kingdom
2012 establishments in the United Kingdom
Organisations based in the London Borough of Newham
Organisations based in the United Kingdom with royal patronage
Organizations established in 1977
Stratford, London